This list includes those who have acted as presenters of Melodifestivalen. In 1986, there were two presenters for the first time, with three and four presenter line-ups later introduced in 2004 (as two sets) and 2019 respectively, while in 2005, 2016 and 2021, various people presented the shows (in 2016 and 2021 as guest co-hosts in each show alongside a main presenter). Melodifestivalen 2000 was presented by no less than 10 past participants and winners.

Presenters

Presenters who formerly competed at Eurovision

Presenters who also presented Eurovision

See also 
 List of Eurovision Song Contest presenters
 List of Junior Eurovision Song Contest presenters

References 

 
Lists of television presenters
Lists of Swedish people